Ichnusa may refer to:

 an older Greek name for the island of Sardinia
 Birra Ichnusa, a Sardinian beer brand owned by Heineken

Ships
 Ichnusa (1986–1988); regional-class RO-RO passenger ferry operated by Tirrenia – Compagnia italiana di navigazione
 Ichnusa; passenger ferry operated by Saremar
 Ichnusa; RO-RO passenger cargo ferry built by Fincantieri – Cantieri Navali Italiani S.p.A.; see List of ships built by Fincantieri
 Ichnusa; 19th-century Gulnara-class aviso of the Piedmontese Navy, see List of ships of the line of Italy

Animals
 Aglais ichnusa, a butterfly found on Corsica and Sardinia
 Ichnusa (genus), an extinct genus of cnidarian from the Ediacaran of Italy

See also

 
 
 Nuragic civilization
 Nuragic language
 Sardinia (disambiguation)